The Economist Intelligence Unit (EIU) is the research and analysis division of the Economist Group, providing forecasting and advisory services through research and analysis, such as monthly country reports, five-year country economic forecasts, country risk service reports, and industry reports. The EIU provides country, industry, and management analysis worldwide and incorporates the former Business International Corporation, a UK company acquired by its parent company in 1986. The EIU has its main offices in four cities—London, New York, Hong Kong and Dubai.

Its Managing Director is Robin Bew, formerly the Editorial Director and Chief Economist.

Acquisitions

Bazian
In December 2012, the Economist Intelligence Unit acquired Bazian, which specialises in the analysis and supply of clinical evidence on health services, treatment, and health technologies to assess clinical effectiveness and value for money. Headquartered in London, Bazian was founded by Vivek Muthu and Anna Donald in 1999.

Clearstate
In April 2012, the Economist Intelligence Unit acquired Clearstate, a market intelligence firm offering customised strategic advisory and primary research specifically addressing the healthcare and life sciences domains within the Asia Pacific. Clearstate was founded in 2006 and is headquartered in Singapore.

Canback 
In July 2015, the Economist Intelligence Unit acquired Canback & Company, a global management consulting firm serving primarily consumer-facing industries and leveraging predictive analytics. It was founded in 2004 and was headquartered in Boston. It was folded into the EIU in 2020.

Reports

CHAMPS
In November 2010, the Economist Intelligence Unit released the Access China White Paper profiling the economies of the top 20 emerging cities in China, directed by Stephen Joske, China Forecasting, for the Economist Intelligence Unit. It was created to support a report conducted by the Economist Intelligence Unit's Access China Service, "CHAMPS: China’s fastest-growing cities". These cities are favoured for several reasons, including the breadth of business opportunities available, the ongoing construction boom, rising home and vehicle ownership and spending on personal appliances. The report coined the acronym CHAMPS (Chongqing, Hefei, Anshan, Maanshan, Pingdingshan and Shenyang).

Democracy Index
In 2006 (with updates in 2008, 2010 and every year since), the Economist Intelligence Unit released the Democracy Index, an index compiled by examining the state of democracy in 167 countries, attempting to quantify this with an Index of Democracy focusing on five general categories—electoral process and pluralism, civil liberties, functioning of government, political participation and political culture.

Government Broadband Index
In January 2011, the Unit released the Government Broadband Index (gBBi), which assesses countries on the basis of government planning, as opposed to current broadband capability. With ambitious targets for both the speed and coverage of next-generation broadband networks, the developed countries of Southeast Asia scored highest. According to the index, Greece is the worst-performing country measured, due to its relatively low coverage target and drawn-out deployment schedule. Greece also suffers due to the considerable size of its public-funding commitment as a percentage of overall government budget revenues, and because its plan does little to encourage competition.

Products

Market Explorer
In November 2015, the Economist Intelligence Unit launched Market Explorer in collaboration with Canback. It is an online tool which was designed to scan markets in various countries and cities across the globe and find the best locations for a product or service.

See also
 Consensus Economics: Surveys of International Economic Forecasts
 E-readiness rankings
 Global Liveability Ranking
 Quality-of-Life Index

References

External links

 The Economist Intelligence Unit

 

Mass media companies of the United Kingdom
Research and analysis firms of the United Kingdom